The BBC Music Awards were the BBC's annual pop music awards, held every December, as a celebration of the musical achievements over the past twelve months. The event was coordinated by the BBC's music division, BBC Music. Held between 2014 and 2017, an awards ceremony took place for the first three years which were broadcast live on BBC One. The final edition was scaled-back with no live awards ceremony held and was instead broadcast on BBC Two.

The overall purpose of the BBC Music Awards was to celebrate the music progression and production of the year in focus. The show looked at artists from the United Kingdom for a majority of the awards and provided other categories for international artists as well. The BBC looked at what songs, albums, and artists had been successful in the year both nationally and globally. The award shows also celebrated how an artist performed in a live setting, such as a large concert or music festival, held throughout the year. The live event, broadcast across TV, radio and online, included an opportunity for several artists to showcase their talent as they performed on the stage in front of the live audience.

History

2014

The inaugural BBC Music Awards was held on 11 December 2014, broadcast live simultaneously across BBC One, BBC Radio 1 and BBC Radio 2. It was held at London's Earl's Court and presented by BBC Radio's Chris Evans and Fearne Cotton.

Artists who performed during the first awards ceremony included One Direction, will.i.am from The Black Eyed Peas and The Voice UK, George Ezra, Take That, Labrinth, Ella Henderson and Catfish and the Bottlemen.

An average audience of 3.9 million watched the ceremony live on BBC One, with a peak audience of 4.7 million at 21:00 GMT.

2015

The second BBC Music Awards took place on 10 December 2015. In 2015, the award for Best Live Performance was introduced, given to an artist who delivered a "stand out live moment" on the BBC. It was held in Birmingham at the Genting Arena.

2016

The third BBC Music Awards was announced on 28 October, stating it would take place on 12 December. It took place in London at ExCeL London. Two new awards were introduced, the BBC Radio 1 Live Lounge Performance of the Year award and the BBC Radio 2 Album of the Year award.

2017
On 21 November 2017, the BBC announced that the fourth BBC Music Awards would be scaled-back with no awards ceremony held. The awards were included as part of The Year In Music 2017, a new studio-based BBC Two programme hosted by Claudia Winkleman and Clara Amfo on 8 December. The show covered the One Love Manchester benefit concert held earlier in the year following the terrorist attack during an Ariana Grande concert in May and featured a larger influence of music than the years prior with new performances and archive broadcasts from different events.

The winners were:
Live Performance of the Year – Foo Fighters at Glastonbury Festival
 Boy Better Know at Glastonbury Festival
 Chic at Glastonbury Festival
 Depeche Mode at Glasgow Barrowland Ballroom
 Katy Perry at BBC Radio 1's Big Weekend
 U2 at The Joshua Tree Tour 2017

Album of the Year – Rag'n'Bone Man, Human
 Calvin Harris, Funk Wav Bounces Vol. 1
 Dua Lipa, Dua Lipa
 Ed Sheeran, ÷
 Stormzy, Gang Signs & Prayer
 The xx, I See You

Artist of the Year – Stormzy
 Ed Sheeran
 Harry Styles
 Kendrick Lamar
 Lorde
 Rag'n'Bone Man

BBC Introducing Artist of the Year – Declan McKenna

List of ceremonies

Performances

References

External links

2014 establishments in the United Kingdom
2017 disestablishments in the United Kingdom
Music Awards
Awards established in 2014
Awards disestablished in 2017
Lifetime achievement awards
BBC Television shows
BBC Radio 1 programmes
BBC Radio 2 programmes